Kez is a rural locality (a settlement) and the administrative center of Kezsky District of the Udmurt Republic, Russia, located  northeast of Izhevsk. Population:

History
It was founded in 1895 due to the construction of a railway. It served as the administrative center of the district since 1929. It was granted urban-type settlement status in 1942, but was demoted back to a rural locality in 2008.

Economy
There are several light and food industry companies; among them a cheese factory ("Kezsky syrzavod").

The settlement serves as a railway station on the Kirov–Perm line.

References

Rural localities in Udmurtia